Oreophryne wapoga is a species of frog in the family Microhylidae. It is endemic to Western New Guinea (Indonesia) and is known from its type locality, the headwaters of the Wapoga River, and from the island of Papua (province), both in the Papua province. The Yapen population might represent a separate species.

Description
Adult males in the type series from Wapoga measure  in snout–urostyle length (SUL); no females were collected. Males from Yapen are on average slightly smaller than from Wapoga, respectively  SUL. A female from Yapen measures  SUL.

Oreophryne wapoga is morphologically similar to Oreophryne atrigularis, but the head is relatively shorter and the eyes bigger. The throat is dark brown, and the pigmentation of the body is more spotted. The ground colour is beige, grey, or brown dorsally and cream ventrally. One of the five Wapoga types has a relatively broad mid-dorsal line.

Reproduction
The male advertisement call is a long series of notes, lasting from about 10 seconds to half a minute. The initial notes of a call series have relatively long inter-note intervals and are followed by "fast" notes, with much higher repetition rates. Individual notes last about 0.05–0.1 seconds. The calls of Yapen males consist of single creaks, small groups of creaks with comparatively long and often irregular inter-note intervals, and longer series of creaks. Males guard the eggs. Development is direct, without free-living tadpole stage. On Yapen, a male was observed carrying eight juveniles on his back.

Habitat and conservation
The live in or under leaf litter, but males can climb to vegetation to call at night.

Oreophryne wapoga occurs at low densities, but it is not believed to face significant threats. The Yapen population probably occurs within the Yapen Nature Reserve.

References

wapoga
Amphibians of Western New Guinea
Endemic fauna of New Guinea
Endemic fauna of Indonesia
Amphibians described in 2001
Taxa named by Rainer Günther
Taxa named by Stephen J. Richards
Taxonomy articles created by Polbot